Snyder is a town in, and the county seat of Scurry County, Texas, United States.  The population was 11,202 at the 2010 census.  The city is located in the lower part of the Southwestern Tablelands ecological region.

History
Snyder is named for merchant and buffalo hunter William Henry (Pete) Snyder, who built a trading post on Deep Creek in 1878. It soon drew fellow hunters, and a small settlement grew up around the post. The nature of those early dwellings, mostly constructed of buffalo hide and tree branches, led to the community's first, if unofficial, name of "Hide Town". Another early name, "Robber's Roost", is said to owe its beginnings to the sometimes nefarious nature of a few residents and a lack of law enforcement. A statue of an albino buffalo on the grounds of the Scurry County Courthouse in Snyder pays homage to the town's beginnings as a buffalo-trading post.

Snyder antedates Scurry County by two years, with a town plan being drawn up in 1882, while the county was not organized until 1884. A population of 600 was reported in 1892, with a school, two churches, a grist mill, steam gin, two banks, and two weekly newspapers being part of the community. Significant change happened in 1907 when Snyder was granted a city charter, and construction began on the Roscoe, Snyder and Pacific Railway. The 1910 census indicated Snyder had grown to a population of 2,514. The Atchison, Topeka & Santa Fe Railway tracks reached Snyder in 1911, spurring further growth. Ranching and farming were the primary economic backbone of Snyder through the first half of the 20th century.

This changed in 1948, when oil was discovered in the Canyon Reef area north of town. Snyder became a boomtown, as the population jumped to about 12,000 in just a year's time. By the time the boom ended in 1951, an estimated peak population of 16,000 had been reached. This soon decreased to the 10,000 to 11,000 level and stabilized. Although the boom was over, oil still remained a vital part of the local economy, with the Snyder area being one of the leading oil-producing areas in Texas. In 1973, the one-billionth barrel of oil was pumped from the nearby oil fields.

An industrial base was established in the 1960s and early 1970s, diversifying the town's economy and making it less susceptible to cycles of boom and bust. Higher education came to Snyder in 1971 with the founding of Western Texas College.

The Scurry County Coliseum in Snyder, operated by Western Texas College since 2008, is a large arena which hosts area events. Outside the coliseum is a locomotive engine and a small restored historic village. Also located in Snyder is the Diamond M Museum. Established by local oilman and rancher Clarence T. McLaughlin, the museum houses over 80 bronze works and 200 paintings. Among the collection are works by Peter Hurd and Andrew Wyeth.

Geography
Snyder is located on Deep Creek, a minor tributary of the Colorado River of Texas.

Climate

Demographics

2020 census

As of the 2020 United States census, there were 11,438 people, 4,360 households, and 2,843 families residing in the city.

2010 census
As of the census of 2010,  11,202 people, 4,128 households, and 2,880 families resided in the city. The population density was 1,256.8 people/sq mi (485.2/km). The 5,013 housing units averaged 584.3/sq mi (225.6/km). The racial makeup of the city was 79.00% White, 4.69% African American, 0.57% Native American, 0.25% Asian, 13.68% from other races, and 1.81% from two or more races. Hispanics or Latinos of any race were 31.8% of the population.

Of the  4,068 households, 34.9% had children under 18 living with them, 55.3% were married couples living together, 11.8% had a female householder with no husband present, and 29.2% were not families. About 26.5% of all households were made up of individuals, and 14.2% had someone living alone who was 65 or older. The average household size was 2.56, and the average family size was 3.10.

In the city, the age distribution was 27.8% under 18, 10.5% from 18 to 24, 24.0% from 25 to 44, 20.8% from 45 to 64, and 16.9% who were 65 or older. The median age was 36 years. For every 100 females, there were 87.3 males. For every 100 females age 18 and over, there were 83.9 males.

The median income for a household in the city was $42,077, and for a family was $55,567. Males had a median income of $30,033 versus $17,609 for females. The per capita income for the city was $23,296. About 13.7% of families and 17.0% of the population were below the poverty line, including 22.4% of those under age 18 and 10.8% of those age 65 or over.

Economy
Snyder's economy is based on oil, gas, and wind industries.  In 2012, 994 jobs were created in Snyder, leading to 20% job growth in the community, according to the Development Corporation of Snyder.

The nearby Scurry Area Canyon Reef Operators oilfield is among the largest and most productive in the United States.  Snyder is also located within the footprint of the recently-discovered Cline Shale.  Two of the largest wind farms in the United States are located in Snyder area.  Other industries in Snyder include manufacturing and cotton.

The Texas Department of Criminal Justice operates the Snyder Distribution Center.

Education
The Snyder Independent School District serves Snyder. The schools are Snyder Primary, Snyder Intermediate, Snyder Junior High School, Snyder Academy, and Snyder High School.

Western Texas College, a two-year community college, is located in Snyder. In addition to traditional academic courses, Western Texas College offers several career/technical programs, including communication design, early childhood education, electrical distribution systems, information technology, business management, petroleum technology, radio broadcasting, solar energy technology, turfgrass and landscape management, vocational nursing, and welding.

Notable people

 Kevin Alejandro (born 1976), who starred in Ugly Betty on ABC as Santos and Southland on TNT as Detective Nate Moretta, a recurring cast member of the HBO series True Blood, and stars in CBS series Golden Boy  grew up in Snyder
 Powers Boothe (1948–2017), Emmy-Award-winning actor who portrayed the demonic clergyman Jim Jones in Guyana Tragedy: The Story of Jim Jones, Curly Bill in Tombstone, Joshua Foss in Sudden Death, and Senator Roark in Sin City is a native of Snyder
 Sonny Cumbie (born 1981), head football coach, Louisiana Tech University. In 2004, as the starting quarterback for Texas Tech University, he led the nation in passing and total offense.
 Charlene Holt, actress and model, starred in Western film El Dorado (1966 film) as Maudie, the love interest of Robert Mitchum and John Wayne, was born in Snyder
 Dick Jones (1927–2014), actor, starred in Buffalo Bill, Jr. in syndication in 1955 as "Dickie" Jones, and was voice of title character in 1940 Disney film Pinocchio, is a native of Snyder
 Charley Lockhart, born and raised in Snyder, was a politician - treasurer of Texas from 1931 to 1941, who  received national media attention as a dwarf. He was known as "the smallest elected official in the biggest state"
 Brad Maule (born 1951), actor, best known for his longtime role as Dr. Tony Jones on the television daytime drama General Hospital, which he played until February 2006, was born in Rotan, Texas, but graduated from Snyder High School; he was a student of Jerry P. Worsham, who was theatre arts educator for several of Snyder's notable actors and actresses
 Dave McGinnis, football coach, head coach of NFL's Arizona Cardinals from 2000–03, graduated in 1969 from Snyder High School
 Barry Tubb, actor, was born in Snyder

Gallery

In popular culture
At the turn of the 20th century, Snyder was rocked by a deadly feud between the families of Billy Johnson and Ed Sims. Gladys Johnson, daughter of banker Billy Johnson, at the age of 14 in 1914, married Ed Sims. The young couple had two daughters, but soon divorced in July 1916. Sims was then shot dead by a Johnson family member. The grand jury in Lamesa failed to bring a true bill against the killer. Gladys Johnson Sims in the spring of 1917 married Texas Ranger Frank Hamer, whose previous marriage ended in divorce. The Hamers raised four children, the daughters of Gladys and Ed Sims, and two of their own, including Frank Hamer, Jr. Frank Hamer died in 1955, but Gladys lived in their home in Austin until her death in 1986 at the age of 85.

See also

References

12 and 14 have bad links

External links

City of Snyder

Cities in Scurry County, Texas
Cities in Texas
County seats in Texas
Micropolitan areas of Texas